The Video Game Decency Act of 2007 was a failed proposed piece of U.S. video game legislation originally introduced into the 109th Congress as  by Congressman Fred Upton on September 29, 2006. The bill was reintroduced into the 110th Congress as H.R. 1531 in March 2007, but died in committee later that year.

The stated aim of the proposed legislation was to "prohibit deceptive acts and practices in the content rating and labeling of video games".

References

Proposed legislation of the 109th United States Congress
Proposed legislation of the 110th United States Congress
Censorship in the United States
Video game censorship
Video game law
Video gaming in the United States
2006 in video gaming
2006 in the United States